Car Jack Streets is a racing game developed and published by Tag Games for mobile phones in 2008, for iPhone in 2009, and for Nintendo DS and PlayStation Portable in 2010.

A Directors Cut edition was published by Tagplay in 2012.

Reception

The game received favourable to mixed reviews on all platforms.

References

External links
 

2008 video games
IOS games
Mobile games
Nintendo DS games
PlayStation Portable games
Racing video games
Tag Games games
Video games developed in the United Kingdom
Single-player video games